Daniel Stahl may refer to:

 Daniel Stahl (game designer) (born 1971),  American game designer
 Daniel Ståhl (born 1992), Swedish discus thrower